WXHT (102.7 FM), better known as "Hot 102.7", is a radio station broadcasting a contemporary hit radio format. Licensed to Madison, Florida, United States, the station is currently owned by Black Crow Media and features programming from Premiere Networks and Westwood One.

History
The station went on the air as WOOP on 1989-04-01. On 1989-10-17, the station changed its call sign to WIMV, and on 2000-07-14, to the current WXHT.

References

External links
Official Website

XHT
Radio stations established in 1989
Contemporary hit radio stations in the United States
1989 establishments in Florida